John McNally (3 November 1932 – 4 April 2022) was an Irish boxer who won a silver medal at the 1952 Summer Olympics in the bantamweight division.  In the final McNally lost a split decision to Pentti Hämäläinen of Finland.

Early life
McNally was born and raised in the Pound Loney area of west Belfast. He was the first person from Belfast and the first Irish boxer to win an Olympic medal.

In 1953, McNally won a bronze medal at the European championships and a gold in the Golden Gloves Championships representing Europe against the US in Chicago. McNally, within the space of a year, beat three American Golden Gloves champions and was awarded an honorary pair of Golden Gloves in recognition of this achievement. In 1953, he was made the official bantamweight champion of Germany in recognition of his feat of having defeated that country's three former bantamweight champions in the space of a year.

1952 Olympic results

Bantamweight
 Last 32: bye
 Last 16: defeated Alejandro Ortuose (Philippines) by unanimous decision (3-0)
 Quarter-final: defeated Vincenzo Dall'osso (Italy) by unanimous decision (3-0)
 Semi-final: defeated Kang Joon-Ho (South Korea) by unanimous decision (3-0)
 Final: lost to Pentti Hamalainen (Finland) by majority decision (1-2)

Pro career
In 1954 McNally turned professional but his pro career did not reach the heights of his amateur days. He fought only 25 times and finished with a record of 14 wins, 9 defeats and 2 draws.

Honours and later life
On 25 October 2007 John McNally was recognised by the Sports Council of Northern Ireland for his contribution to Irish sport at a gala event held at Stormont in Belfast. On 4 January 2008 John McNally was inducted into the Irish Boxing Hall of Fame by RTÉ's Jimmy Magee at an awards night held in the National Stadium in Dublin. A biography of McNally's life and career has been published by Appletree Press.

McNally died in Belfast on 4 April 2022, aged 89.

References

External links
 

1932 births
2022 deaths
Boxers at the 1952 Summer Olympics
Olympic boxers of Ireland
Olympic silver medalists for Ireland
Male boxers from Northern Ireland
Boxers from Belfast
Olympic medalists in boxing
Medalists at the 1952 Summer Olympics
Irish male boxers
Bantamweight boxers